Krief is a surname, likely of French origin. Notable people with the surname include:

Annie Ousset-Krief (born 1954), French historian and professor
Bérengère Krief (born 1983), French actress and comedian
Norbert Krief (born 1956), French rock guitarist
Patrick Krief (born 1979), Canadian musician and singer-songwriter
Thomas Krief (born 1993), French freestyle skier

References